Karasuk is a hypothetical language family that links the Yeniseian languages of central Siberia with the Burushaski language of northern Pakistan.

History of proposals
Hyde Clarke (1870) first noted a possible connection between the Yeniseian and Burushaski languages.

The name Karasuk was proposed by George van Driem of the University of Leiden. The family is named after the Karasuk culture, which existed in Central Asia during the Bronze Age in second millennium BCE. Van Driem postulates the Burusho people took part in the Indo-Aryan migration out of Central Asia and into the northern part of the Indian sub-continent, while other Karasuk peoples migrated northwards to become the Yeniseians. These claims have been picked up by anthropologist and linguist Roger Blench (1999).

Václav Blažek (2019) places the linguistic homeland of Proto-Yeniseian close to where Burushaski is now spoken today. He argues that based on hydronomic evidence, Yeniseian languages were originally spoken on the northern slopes of the Tianshan and Pamir mountains before dispersing downstream via the Irtysh River.

Morphological evidence
The evidence for Karasuk is mostly in the verbal and nominal morphology. Ket has two verbal declensions, one prefixed with d- and one with b-, and Burushaski likewise has two, one prefixed with d- and one without such a marker. However, neither the Burushaski nor the Yeniseian verbal morphology has been rigorously analysed, and reviewers have found the evidence to be weak.

While Yeniseian has been proposed to be related to the Na-Dene languages of North America, as part of a newly named Dene–Yeniseian family, the relevant morphological correspondences between Na-Dene and Yeniseian have not been found in Burushaski.

Lexical cognates 
Below is a list of possible cognates:

{| class="wikitable"
|+Suggested cognates
!Proto-Yeniseian
!Burushaski
!English
|-
|*binč
|melc
|chin/jaw
|-
|*siː
|si/su
|eat
|-
|*seŋ
|sán
|liver/spleen
|-
|*ʔig
|yek
|name
|-
|*qoʎ 
|qʌt
|armpit
|-
|*təga
|ʔ(r)ək
|breast/chest
|-
|*pʌx
|pak
|clean
|-
|*dʌr
|thɛr
|dirt/dirty
|}

Kassian and Starostin (2017) list the following potential cognates between Proto-Yeniseian and Proto-Burushaski.

{| class="wikitable sortable"
! gloss !! Proto-Yeniseian !! Proto-Burushaski
|-
| ‘dry’ || *qɔɢ- || *qaq-
|-
| ‘to eat’ || *siː- || *ʂi-
|-
| ‘to give’ || *=o || *=u-
|-
| ‘to kill’ || *xeːy || *=s=ʁa-
|-
| ‘name’ || *ʔiɢ || *ek
|-
| ‘that’ || *ʔu, *ʔa || *i-
|-
| ‘eye’ || *de-s || *=l-ɕi
|-
| ‘I’ || *ʔaʒ || *ʓa
|-
| ‘leaf’ || *yəːpe || *ƛap
|-
| ‘root’ || *ciːǯ || *cʰereʂ
|-
| ‘thou’ || *ʔaw || *un
|}

References

Proposed language families